Powerlifting at the 2000 Summer Paralympics consisted of 20 events.

Medal summary

Medal table

Participating nations

Events

Men's events

Women's events

References 

 

 
2000 Summer Paralympics events
Paralympics